Estela Reyes is an American politician who is a member of the Massachusetts House of Representatives for the 4th Essex district. Elected in November 2022, assumed office on January 4, 2023.

Early life 
Reyes moved with her family from Santiago de los Caballeros to Lawrence, Massachusetts.

Career 
Reyes has served as a member of the Lawrence City Council since 2012, including as vice president. She was also a member of the Community Development Advisory Board and advised the mayor on community development policy. She was elected to the Massachusetts House of Representatives in November 2022.

References 

Living people
Democratic Party members of the Massachusetts House of Representatives
Women state legislators in Massachusetts
Hispanic and Latino American state legislators in Massachusetts
People from Lawrence, Massachusetts
Politicians from Lawrence, Massachusetts
People from Santiago de los Caballeros
American politicians of Dominican Republic descent
21st-century American politicians
21st-century American women politicians
Year of birth missing (living people)